Gholamlu (also Romanized as Gholāmlū; also known as Shalāmlū) is a village in Sis Rural District, in the Central District of Shabestar County, East Azerbaijan Province, Iran. At the 2006 census, its population was 388, in 103 families.

References 

Populated places in Shabestar County